USS LST-1060 was an  in the United States Navy. Like many of her class, she was not named and is properly referred to by her hull designation.

Construction
She was laid down on 22 December 1944, at Hingham, Massachusetts, by the Bethlehem-Hingham Shipyard; launched on 29 January 1945; sponsored by Mrs. Alice M. Wiggin; and commissioned on 24 February 1945.

Service history
Following World War II, LST-1060 performed occupation duty in the Far East and saw service in China until mid-July 1946. She was decommissioned on 7 September 1946, and struck from the Navy list on 23 April 1947. On 13 February 1948, the ship was sold to Bosey, Philippines.

Notes

Citations

Bibliography 

Online resources

External links
 

 

LST-542-class tank landing ships
Ships built in Hingham, Massachusetts
1945 ships
World War II amphibious warfare vessels of the United States